Sidney Robert Crowl (18 March 1888 – 1971) was a professional footballer who played for Enfield and Tottenham Hotspur.

Football career 
Crowl, an outside left began his career at Enfield before joining Tottenham Hotspur in 1913 where he played in one match.

References 

1888 births
1971 deaths
Footballers from Enfield, London
English footballers
English Football League players
Tottenham Hotspur F.C. players
Enfield F.C. players
Association football forwards